The name Hanna or Hannah has been used for eleven tropical cyclones worldwide: five in the Atlantic Ocean and six in the Western Pacific Ocean (four regionally in the Philippines by PAGASA). The latter spelling has also been used for one extratropical European windstorm.

In the Atlantic:
 Hurricane Hannah (1959) – Category 3 hurricane, was only a threat to shipping.
 Tropical Storm Hanna (2002) – struck the Gulf Coast of the United States.
 Hurricane Hanna (2008)  – Category 1 hurricane, caused over 500 deaths in Haiti before traveling up the U.S. Eastern Seaboard.
 Tropical Storm Hanna (2014) – formed from the remnants of Tropical Storm Trudy from the Eastern Pacific, dissipated, then reorganized, and made landfall in Nicaragua.
 Hurricane Hanna (2020) – Category 1 hurricane, impacted South Texas and Northeastern Mexico.

In the Western Pacific:
 Typhoon Hannah (1947) – remained over the open ocean.
 Tropical Depression Hannah (1997) (01W, Atring)  – dissipated just east of Mindanao, Philippines.
 Tropical Storm Lekima (2007) (T0714, 16W, Hanna) – a deadly tropical storm that affected both Philippines and Vietnam.
 Tropical Storm Tokage (2011) (T1107, 09W, Hanna)
 Typhoon Soudelor (2015) (T1513, 13W, Hanna) – Category 5 super typhoon, had severe impacts in the Northern Mariana Islands, Taiwan, and eastern China.
 Typhoon Lekima (2019) (T1910, 10W, Hanna) – Category 4 super typhoon, caused destruction to East China.

In Europe:
 Storm Hannah (2019)

Atlantic hurricane set index articles
Pacific typhoon set index articles